Bickerton may refer to:

Places
Bickerton, Cheshire, village and civil parish in England, United Kingdom
Bickerton Hill, Cheshire
Bickerton, Devon, England, United Kingdom
Bickerton, North Yorkshire, England, United Kingdom
Bickerton Island, small island off Australia
Cape Bickerton, Adélie Land, Antarctica

People
Bickerton (surname)
Bickerton baronets, an extinct title in the Baronetage of Great Britain
Derek Bickerton, linguist

Other
HMS Bickerton (K466), a British Captain-class frigate of the Second World War
Bickerton (bicycle), a folding bicycle manufactured in the UK between 1971 and 1991

See also
Port Bickerton, Nova Scotia, Canada, a small community